The Irdin Manha Formation is a geological formation from the Eocene located in Inner Mongolia, China, a few kilometres south of the Mongolian border

Fossil content

Mammals
U.S. paleontologists Henry Fairfield Osborn and Roy C. Andrews discovered two premolars on the site in 1923, and assigned the specimen to the new genus Eudinoceras because he believed it to be related to "Dinoceras" (now known as Uintatherium).  Within a decade, however, as more complete specimens were recovered, the animal was identified as a Mongolian relative to the North American pantodont Coryphodon. The expedition also lead to the discovery of the only known skull of Andrewsarchus.

Artiodactyls

Cimolestans

Dinoceratans

Ferae

Glires

Mesonychians

Perissodactyls

Primates

Reptiles

Birds

Crocodilians

Testudines

Fish

See also 
 List of fossil sites

References 

Geologic formations of China
Paleogene System of Asia
Eocene Series
Paleogene China
Paleontology in Inner Mongolia